The Men's 50 metre breaststroke event at the 2002 Commonwealth Games took place between 2 August 2002 and 3 August 2002 at Manchester Aquatics Centre.

Schedule
All times are Coordinated Universal Time (UTC)

Records
Prior to the competition, the existing world and championship records were as follows.

The following new records were set during this competition.

Results

Heats 
The heats were held the morning session on 2 August.

Semifinals 
The semifinals were held the evening session on 2 August.

Final 
The final were held the evening session on 3 August.

References

External links

Swimming at the 2002 Commonwealth Games
Commonwealth Games